Events in the year 1943 in Brazil.

Incumbents

Federal government
 President: Getúlio Vargas

Governors
 Alagoas: Ismar de Góis Monteiro
 Amazonas: Álvaro Botelho Maia
 Bahia: Renato Onofre Pinto Aleixo
 Ceará: Francisco de Meneses Pimentel
 Espírito Santo: João Punaro Bley (till 21 January); Jones dos Santos Neves (from 21 January)
 Goiás: Pedro Ludovico Teixeira
 Maranhão: 
 Mato Grosso: Júlio Strübing Müller
 Minas Gerais: Benedito Valadares Ribeiro
 Pará: 
 till 25 January: José Carneiro da Gama Malcher
 25 January-20 February: Miguel de Almeida Filho
 from 25 February: Magalhães Barata
 Paraíba: Rui Carneiro
 Paraná: Manuel Ribas
 Pernambuco: Agamenon Magalhães
 Piauí: Leônidas Melo
 Rio Grande do Norte: Rafael Fernandes Gurjão/Antonio Fernandes Dantas
 Rio Grande do Sul: Osvaldo Cordeiro de Farias/Ernesto Dornelles 
 Santa Catarina: Nereu Ramos
 São Paulo: Fernando de Sousa Costa
 Sergipe: Augusto Maynard Gomes

Vice governors
 Rio Grande do Norte: no vice governor
 São Paulo: no vice governor

Events
11 June - The Order of Military Merit is established by President Getúlio Vargas. 
23 July - On the recommendation of the National Petroleum Council, Brazil bans the use of private motorcycles throughout the nation in order to conserve fuel.  Use of gasoline-powered automobiles had been prohibited the year before.
31 July - The Brazilian passenger ship and freighter Bage, largest commercial ship in Brazil's fleet, is torpedoed and sunk off the coast of the Sergipe state.  The Bage, carrying 129 passengers and 102 crew, was en route from Belem to Rio de Janeiro when it was struck by a German U-boat.  Seventy-eight people (41 passengers and 37 crew) are lost.
13 September - The Iguaçu Territory becomes a Brazilian territory.
December - The prototype of the CNNA HL-8 makes its maiden flight.

Arts and culture

Books
Maria José Dupré - Éramos Seis
G. E. Kidder Smith - Brazil Builds

Films
Brazil at War (short propaganda film produced by the Office of War Information and the Office of the Coordinator of Inter-American Affairs 
Samba in Berlin, directed by Luiz de Barros and starring Mesquitinha

Births
8 February - José Antônio Rezende de Almeida Prado, composer (died 2010). 
19 February - Pedro Malan, economist and politician
21 June - Eumir Deodato, pianist, composer, producer and arranger 
14 August - Imre Simon, Hungarian-born Brazilian mathematician and computer scientist (died 2009)
26 August - Dori Caymmi, singer, guitarist, songwriter, arranger, and producer, son of Dorival Caymmi 
3 September - Waly Salomão, poet (died 2003)
19 September - Cesar Camargo Mariano, pianist, arranger, composer and music producer
12 November - Claudio Slon, jazz musician (died 2002)

Deaths
20 February - Elsie Houston, singer (born 1902; suicide) 
date unknown - Vittorio Capellaro, Italian Brazilian film director, film producer, film actor, and screenwriter (born 1877)

References

See also 
1943 in Brazilian football
List of Brazilian films of 1943

 
1940s in Brazil
Years of the 20th century in Brazil
Brazil
Brazil